Alfred Hitchcock's Anthology – Volume 4 is the fourth installment of Alfred Hitchcock's Anthology, one of the many Alfred Hitchcock story collection books; edited by Eleanor Sullivan. Originally published in hardcover as Alfred Hitchcock's Tales to Scare You Stiff in 1978, the book includes 26 short stories and a short novel called The Graveyard Shift by William P. McGivern. Also, within the 26 short stories is The Green Heart by Jack Ritchie which was made into the 1971 film A New Leaf.

References

1979 anthologies
Mystery anthologies
Works originally published in Alfred Hitchcock's Mystery Magazine
Dial Press books